Bani Abd is a sub-district located in Iyal Surayh District, 'Amran Governorate, Yemen. Bani Abd had a population of 7496 according to the 2004 census.

References 

Sub-districts in Iyal Surayh District